Columbia City Historic District is a national historic district located at Columbia City, Whitley County, Indiana.  The district encompasses 197 contributing buildings in the central business district and surrounding residential sections of Columbia City.  It developed between about 1840 and 1937 and includes representative examples of Greek Revival, Italianate, Queen Anne, Second Empire, Classical Revival, and Bungalow / American Craftsman style architecture. Located in the district is the separately listed Whitley County Courthouse.  Other notable contributing buildings include the former Whitley County Courthouse (1841), Adams Y. Hooper Residence (c. 1860), Thomas Shorb Residence (c. 1875), William McNagny Residence (c. 1880), Elisha L. McLallen House (1905), Whitley County Jail (1875), City Hall (1917), Peabody (Carnegie) Library (1919), U.S. Post Office (1935), Central Building (1872), D.B. Clugston Block (1889), Masonic Temple (1904), Church of the Brethren (1889), Presbyterian Church (1892), Methodist Church (1912), and Baptist Church (1917).

It was listed on the National Register of Historic Places in 1987.

References

Gallery

Historic districts on the National Register of Historic Places in Indiana
Greek Revival architecture in Indiana
Italianate architecture in Indiana
Queen Anne architecture in Indiana
Second Empire architecture in Indiana
Neoclassical architecture in Indiana
Bungalow architecture in Indiana
Buildings and structures in Whitley County, Indiana
National Register of Historic Places in Whitley County, Indiana